NSG may stand for: 

 National Security Guard, a special force in India
 National Street Gazetteer, a database of all streets in England and Wales
 Naturschutzgebiet, a nature protection category in Germany
 Nebraska State Guard, active during World War II and the Vietnam War
 New Southgate railway station, London, National Rail station code
 Nippon Sheet Glass, a Japanese glass manufacturer
 NSG mouse, an immunodeficient laboratory mouse strain
 Nordic Support Group, a multinational peacekeeping force 
 North Sea Gas, natural gas from the North Sea oil field
 Northampton School for Girls, a girls secondary school in Northampton, UK
 NetWare Systems Group, a former division of Novell
 Nuclear Suppliers Group, an international body regulating export of technology related to nuclear weapons